State Road 445 (NM 445) is a  state highway in the US state of New Mexico. NM 445's southern terminus is at Interstate 25 (I-25) in Maxwell, and the northern terminus is at U.S. Route 64 (US 64) north-northeast of Maxwell.

Major intersections

See also

References

445
Transportation in Colfax County, New Mexico